Edet is a given name and surname.

Surname 
Glory Emmanuel Edet, Nigerian advocate for women and child-rights
Emilie Edet (born 1946),  Nigerian sprinter
Louis Edet (1914–1979), Inspector General of the Nigeria Police Force
Nicolas Edet (born 1987), French road cyclist
Victor Edet (born 1966), Nigerian sprinter

Given name 
Donatus Edet Akpan (born 1952), Nigerian bishop of the Roman Catholic Diocese of Ogoja
Edet Amana (born 1938), Nigerian engineer
Edet Belzberg, American documentary filmmaker
Eyo Edet Okon (1914–2010), Nigerian Christian clergy
Edet Otobong (born 1986), Cameroonian footballer
Joseph Edet Akinwale Wey (1918–1991), Nigerian Navy admiral and Vice President of Nigeria

See also 
Edet FK, Swedish football club
Lilla Edet, is a locality and the seat of Lilla Edet Municipality in Västra Götaland County, Sweden
Lilla Edets IF, Swedish football club
Lilla Edet Municipality, is a municipality in Västra Götaland County in western Sweden